The Sikkim Football Association (SFA) is one of the 37 Indian state football associations that are affiliated to the All India Football Federation (AIFF), based out of Sikkim, India.

History
The Sikkim Football Association was formed in the year 1976, while previously it was known as the Gangtok Football and Sporting Association. Sikkim football dates back with first local team, Kumar Sporting Club.

The federation started Sikkim Gold Cup in 1979 with the help of the Sikkim government.

As interest in football in Sikkim went down due to the lack of organizing, former India football team captain Baichung Bhutia, who was born in Sikkim, founded the club United Sikkim.

Football competition structure

References

Football governing bodies in India
1976 establishments in Sikkim
Football in Sikkim
Organisations based in Sikkim
Sports organizations established in 1976